Moebjergarctus is a genus of tardigrades in the family Halechiniscidae.

References

Tardigrade genera
Halechiniscidae